Turn Island, is a  island in the San Juan Islands in the Salish Sea in the U.S. state of Washington. The island sits in the San Juan Channel about 900 feet off the eastern edge of San Juan Island. It is preserved as Turn Island Marine State Park and is part of the San Juan Islands National Wildlife Refuge. The island has 12 campsites and is only accessible by water.

History
Charles Wilkes, during the Wilkes Expedition of 1838-1842, thought it was part of San Juan Island and named it Point Salisbury after one of his officers. In 1858, the British found that it was an island with dangerous rocks in the channel between it and San Juan Island. The name Turn Island and Turn Rocks were given to mark the proper sailing channel.

See also

References

External links
Turn Island Marine State Park Washington State Parks and Recreation Commission

San Juan Islands
State parks of Washington (state)
Parks in San Juan County, Washington
Protected areas established in 1959
Uninhabited islands of Washington (state)